11th meridian may refer to:

11th meridian east, a line of longitude east of the Greenwich Meridian
11th meridian west, a line of longitude west of the Greenwich Meridian